Tiexi District, is located in the southwest of Anshan, Liaoning province, China.

The main plant of Anshan Steel limited company is in this district. The Technology developing district is also here.

Administrative divisions
There are 11 subdistricts.

Subdistricts:
Yongle Subdistrict
Gonghe Subdistrict
Xingsheng Subdistrict
Bajiazi Subdistrict
Qiming Subdistrict
Fanrong Subdistrict
Xintao Subdistrict
Dalu Subdistrict
Beitaoguan Subdistrict
Nanhua Subdistrict
Yongfa Subdistrict

References

External links

Anshan
County-level divisions of Liaoning